Group Certificate may refer to:
 Group Certificate (Ireland) a school examination offered from 1947 to 1991
 Group Certificate (Australia) a certificate of pay-as-you-go tax